Ilanz railway station is a railway station in the municipality of Ilanz/Glion, in the Swiss canton of Graubünden. It is an intermediate stop on the  gauge Reichenau-Tamins–Disentis/Mustér line of the Rhaetian Railway.

Services
The following services stop at Ilanz:

Facilities
The station has a toilet at the back of the building. There is also a staffed ticket desk as well as a kiosk and various vending machines.

Location
The station is in the heart of the town, 5 mins from the migros shopping centre and only 2 or 3 minutes from the town centre. It is directly outside the post office where the postautos (buses) can be taken.

Postauto Connections
The buses all collect outside the station and depart and arrive to supplement the railway timetables. Routes include:

 Ilanz-Vals Zerfreila
 Ilanz-Reien
 Ilanz-Falera

References

External links 
 
 
 

Railway stations in Graubünden
Rhaetian Railway stations
Railway stations in Switzerland opened in 1903